Ilion may refer to:

Ilion (Ἴλιον) or (Latinized) Ilium, an Archaic name for the pre-classical city of Troy, hence the title of Homer's Iliad, also a Byzantine city and bishopric, which remains a Latin Catholic titular see as Ilium
 Ilion, Greece, a suburb of Athens, Greece, also known as Nea Liosia
 Ilium (Epirus), ancient city of Epirus, Greece
 Ilion, ancient name of Cestria (Epirus), a town of ancient Epirus, Greece
 Ilion (Thessaly), a town of ancient Thessaly, Greece
 Ilion Animation Studios, a CGI animation studio based in Madrid, Spain
 Ilion, New York, a village in Herkimer County, New York

See also 
 Ilium (disambiguation)
 Iliad (disambiguation)
 Ileum, the third and final part of the small intestine